Clerihan or Ballyclerahan is a village in County Tipperary, Ireland. It is also a civil parish in the barony of Iffa and Offa East. It is approximately 8.5 kilometres north of Clonmel. Its name comes from the Irish meaning O'Clerahan's town. Locally, the "Bally" prefix is usually dropped and the village is almost always referred to simply as "Clerahan" which is most often spelled "Clerihan".

Location and transport
The village is situated along the R688 regional road from Cashel to Clonmel. Clerihan is 8 kilometres north of the N24 road which leads to Waterford the closest city to Clerihan which is approximately 56 kilometres from the village. The closest airport to Clerihan is Waterford Airport located 65 kilometres south of the village, and the Port of Waterford is the closest port.

See also
 List of civil parishes of County Tipperary
 List of towns and villages in Ireland

References

Towns and villages in County Tipperary
Civil parishes of Iffa and Offa East